Woh Apna Sa (Translation: Like My Own) (English title: Kindred Hearts) is an Indian Hindi soap opera television series, produced by Rashmi Sharma Telefilms and distributed by Zee Entertainment Enterprises. It premiered 23 January 2017 on Zee TV. The show starred Sudeep Sahir, Disha Parmar, Ridhi Dogra, Manasi Salvi and Kunal Karan Kapoor.

It replaced Yeh Vaada Raha. The show marked Parmar's second television series. It went off air on 20 July 2018 with 391 episodes, and was replaced by Yeh Teri Galiyan.

Plot

Aditya Jindal has a troubled marriage with the selfish Nisha Jindal but remains with her for their daughters Chinni and Binni as well as his family who think highly of Nisha. Later, Jhanvi Agarwal enters Aditya's life. As a deep bond develops between Jhanvi and Aditya, he turns to her for support in ending his marital problems for good. Soon they expose Nisha's true colors and realize their feelings for each other. Aditya divorces Nisha. Jhanvi and Aditya get married. Chinni and Binni accept Jhanvi. However, Aditya and Jhanvi's happiness is short-lived as Nisha takes revenge by killing them near Kuldevi Temple. Later they are reincarnated as Jiya and Arjun.

Cast

Main
 Sudeep Sahir as Aditya Amrish Jindal (2017)/Arjun Bagaa / Bansal Prakash Khanna (2017–2018)
 Disha Parmar as Jhanvi Agarwal/Jhanvi Aditya Jindal (2017)/Jia Mehra (2017–2018)
 Ridhi Dogra/Manasi Salvi as Nisha Verma/Nisha Aditya Jindal/Nisha Samar Shukla (2017–2018)
 Kunal Karan Kapoor as Inspector Krishna Shekhawat (2018)

Recurring
 Kinshuk Vaidya as Dr. Akash Prakash Khanna (2018)
 Sara Khan as Rano Dey (2018)
 Ashish Kapoor as Samar Shukla (2017–2018)
 Bhavya Sachdeva as Chirag Samar Shukla (2017–2018)
 Charvi Saraf as Chinni Aditya Jindal (2017–2018)
 Swasti Katyal as Child Chinni Jindal (2017)
 Tanya Sharma as Binni Aditya Jindal (2017–2018)
 Elisha Jawrani as Child Binni Jindal (2017)
 Alka Kaushal as Ambika Prakash Khanna (2018)
 Jitendra Bhardwaj as Prakash Khanna (2018)
 Shalini Arora/ Ushma Rathoda as Sharda Dharmesh Jindal (2017–2018)
 Lata Sabharwal as Kalyani Amrish Jindal (2017)
 Vikram Sahu as Amrish Jindal (2017–2018)
 Buneet Kapoor as Rajan "Raj" Amrish Jindal (2017)
 Vedika Bhandari as Neha Thakur/Neha Rajan Jindal (2017)
 Amit Behl as Dharmesh Jindal (2017)
 Anandi Tripathi as Sahira Agarwal (2017)
Sabina Jat as Surbhi Agarwal (2017)
Isha Anand Sharma as Dr. Priya Anand
 Ananya Khare as Sudha Mehat
 Reyhna Malhotra as Tamara Onkar

References

2017 Indian television series debuts
Hindi-language television shows
Indian television soap operas
Indian drama television series
Zee TV original programming
2018 Indian television series endings